"Saturday-morning cartoon" is a colloquial term for the original animated series programming that was typically scheduled on Saturday and Sunday mornings in the United States on the "Big Three" television networks. The genre's popularity had a broad peak from the mid-1960s through the mid-2000s; over time it declined, in the face of changing cultural norms, increased competition from formats available at all times, and heavier regulations. In the last two decades of the genre's existence, Saturday-morning and Sunday-morning cartoons were primarily created and aired to meet regulations on children's television programming in the United States, or E/I. Minor television networks, in addition to the non-commercial PBS in some markets, continue to air animated programming on Saturday and Sunday while partially meeting those mandates.

In the United States, the generally accepted times for these and other children's programs to air on Saturday mornings were from 8:00 a.m. to approximately 1:00 p.m. Eastern Time Zone. Until the late 1970s, American networks also had a schedule of children's programming on Sunday mornings, though most programs at this time were repeats of Saturday-morning shows that were already out of production. In some markets, some shows were pre-empted in favor of syndicated or other types of local programming. Saturday-morning and Sunday-morning cartoons were largely discontinued in Canada by 2002. In the United States, The CW continued to air non-E/I cartoons as late as 2014; among the "Big Three" traditional major networks, the final non-E/I cartoon to date (Kim Possible) was last aired in 2006. Cable television networks have since then revived the practice of debuting their most popular animated programming on Saturday and Sunday mornings on a sporadic basis.

History

Early cartoons

Although the Saturday-morning timeslot had always featured a great deal of children's television series beginning in the early 1950s, the idea of commissioning new animated series for broadcast on Saturday mornings caught on in the mid-1960s, when the networks realized that they could concentrate kids' viewing on that one morning to appeal to advertisers, notably manufacturers of toys and breakfast cereals. Furthermore, limited animation, such as that produced by such studios as Filmation, DePatie–Freleng Enterprises, Total Television, Jay Ward Productions and Hanna-Barbera, was economical enough to produce in sufficient quantity to fill the five-hour block of time, as compared to live-action programming. While production times and costs were undeniably higher with animated programming, the cost of talent was far less (voice actors became known for their ability to perform several characters at once, sometimes even on the same show) and networks could rerun children's animated programming more frequently than most live-action series, due to the belief that children would not remember the original airings enough to lose interest, negating any financial disadvantages. The experiment proved successful, and the timeslots were filled with profitable programming.

Until the late 1960s, a number of Saturday-morning cartoons were reruns of animated series made for prime time during a brief flurry of such series a few years earlier.  These included Hanna-Barbera's The Flintstones, 
Top Cat, The Jetsons and Jonny Quest, Ross Bagdasarian's The Alvin Show, and Bob Clampett's Beany and Cecil.

Some Saturday-morning programs consisted of telecasts of older cartoons made for movie theaters, such as the Looney Tunes and Merrie Melodies cartoons produced by Warner Bros. Cartoons, the Tom and Jerry cartoons produced by Metro-Goldwyn-Mayer and directed by William Hanna and Joseph Barbera for that studio prior to establishing their own company; the Mighty Mouse and Heckle and Jeckle cartoons produced by Paul Terry's Terrytoons, and Walter Lantz's Woody Woodpecker cartoons (supplied by Universal Pictures). During the 1960s and 1970s, it was not uncommon to have animated shorts produced with both film and television in mind (DePatie-Freleng, established by two former WB employees, was particularly associated with this business model), so that by selling the shorts to theaters, the studios could afford a higher budget than would otherwise be available from television alone, which at the time was still a free medium for the end-user, except for a minority of households that had cable television, then strictly a medium for delivering signals from distant TV stations. Some of these legacy characters later appeared in "new" versions by other producers (Tom and Jerry by Hanna and Barbera for their own company, and later by Filmation; Mighty Mouse by Filmation and later by Ralph Bakshi; Pink Panther and Sons by Hanna-Barbera with Friz Freleng as a consultant).

The remainder of the networks' Saturday-morning schedules were filled by reruns of black-and-white live-action series made in the 1950s, usually with a western background (The Lone Ranger, The Roy Rogers Show, Sky King, Fury, The Adventures of Rin Tin Tin, My Friend Flicka, etc.) and occasional first-run live-action series such as The Magic Land of Allakazam, the later color episodes of Howdy Doody, The Shari Lewis Show, Shenanigans, and Watch Mr. Wizard.

Independent stations (TV stations not affiliated with networks) usually did not show cartoons on Saturday mornings, instead running feature films (usually western or low-budget series movies such as The Bowery Boys or Bomba, the Jungle Boy), chapters of "cliffhanger" serial film, comedy short films made for movie theatres (Laurel and Hardy, The Three Stooges, and Our Gang), older live-action syndicated series like The Adventures of Superman, The Cisco Kid, Ramar of the Jungle, The Abbott and Costello Show, The Adventures of Robin Hood, Hopalong Cassidy, Flash Gordon, and Sheena, Queen of the Jungle, and regional sports shows, often wrestling or bowling programs. This was a counterprogramming strategy aimed either at children who were not interested in the typical network fare or adults wanting to watch something other than cartoons.

Cartoons based on advertising material were restricted by the Federal Trade Commission by the late 1960s. A notable example is Linus the Lionhearted, which ran from 1964 to 1969. The characters in the series were lifted from Post cereals and the commercials for each of the cereals utilized an art style identical to the program, which would have made it more difficult for children to distinguish the commercials from the program.

1960s–1980s

1960s

The mid-1960s brought a boom in superhero cartoon series, some adapted from comic books, (Superman, Aquaman, Spider-Man, Fantastic Four), and others original (Space Ghost, The Herculoids, Birdman and the Galaxy Trio, etc.).  Also included were parodies of the superhero genre (Underdog, The Super 6, and George of the Jungle, among others).  Another development was the popular music-based cartoon, featuring both real-life groups (The Beatles, The Jackson 5ive, and The Osmonds) as well as anonymous studio musicians (The Archies, Josie and the Pussycats); this was particularly popular during the heyday of bubblegum pop music from circa 1968 to 1972.  Live-action series continued to some extent with Sid and Marty Krofft's H.R. Pufnstuf and Sigmund and the Sea Monsters, Hanna-Barbera's The Banana Splits, Stan Burns and Mike Marmer's Lancelot Link, Secret Chimp, ABC's Curiosity Shop (produced by Chuck Jones), Don Kirshner's widely-popular The Monkees, and the British import slapstick comedy Here Come the Double Deckers.

1970s
With the 1970s came a wave of animated versions of popular live-action prime time series, mainly with the voices of the original casts, including The Brady Bunch (The Brady Kids), Star Trek (Star Trek: The Animated Series), Emergency! (Emergency +4), Gilligan's Island (The New Adventures of Gilligan and later Gilligan's Planet in the 1980s), Happy Days (The Fonz and the Happy Days Gang), Laverne & Shirley (Laverne & Shirley in the Army), Mork & Mindy (Mork & Mindy/Laverne & Shirley/Fonz Hour), The Partridge Family (Partridge Family 2200 A.D.; the cast were also semi-regulars on Goober and the Ghost Chasers), and The Dukes of Hazzard (The Dukes). More loosely adapted was The Oddball Couple, which turned Neil Simon's mismatched roommates into a sloppy dog and a fastidious cat. Many of these animated spin-offs featured storylines and settings that would not be credible or feasible in most live-action series (such as trips around the world and/or into space). The ties between the animated spin-offs and their live-action origins varied widely, depending on how much input the original cast and crew were willing to contribute (and how much the animation companies were willing to pay for that talent); in retrospect, animated versions of TV series are generally not treated as canonical by fans.

Other adaptations of familiar characters and properties included Tarzan (Tarzan, Lord of the Jungle), Planet of the Apes (Return to the Planet of the Apes), Lassie (Lassie's Rescue Rangers) and Godzilla. At this same time, the great success of Scooby-Doo spawned numerous imitations, combining The Archie Show-style teen characters and talking animals with light-weight mystery stories (Speed Buggy, Jabberjaw, etc.) Comedian Bill Cosby successfully blended educational elements with both comedy and music in the popular, long-running Fat Albert and the Cosby Kids.

Filmation, primarily a cartoon producer, also turned out several live-action Saturday-morning series in the 1970s, including Shazam! (with animated sequences) and The Secret of Isis, Jason of Star Command, The Ghost Busters (not related to the 1984 hit movie, but rather a 1975 vehicle for former F Troop stars Larry Storch and Forrest Tucker) and Uncle Croc's Block.

1980s
The success of Star Wars toys convinced manufacturers of the enormous profit potential in developing their own intellectual properties to base toys on. Along with the FCC's looser interpretation of programming regulations under President Ronald Reagan, this led to the era of "half-hour toy commercials" that became almost synonymous with 1980s cartoons. The first were Masters of the Universe and G.I. Joe: A Real American Hero in 1983, followed by The Transformers, M.A.S.K., Jem and the Holograms, Thundercats, Silverhawks, Visionaries: Knights of the Magical Light, My Little Pony, and others. Defining cartoons of the 1980s that had associated toy lines, but which were not created specifically for the purpose of selling toys, included Teenage Mutant Ninja Turtles, which began as an independent comic book series, and The Real Ghostbusters, based on the live-action movie from 1984; both continued to be produced into the 1990s, and in fact, Ninja Turtles lasted so long that most of its episodes were produced and aired in the 1990s, though it is still associated more in the public mind with the 1980s due to major changes in format and tone toward the end of the series run.

A Hanna-Barbera adaptation of the Belgian comic strip The Smurfs became a huge success in the 1980s, bringing with it other series with fairy tale-like settings (My Little Pony, Monchichis, The Biskitts, Trollkins, Snorks, etc.). Most of the genres made popular in previous generations (talking animals, superheroes, teen mysteries, science fiction, and live-action adaptations) continued to appear as well, with the exception of the musical band cartoons (only one of note, the syndicated Jem, emerged in the 1980s), as by this point, music videos from real bands were becoming commonplace on American television in the wake of the rise of MTV. CBS and the producing team of Lee Mendelson and Bill Melendez, acclaimed for their Emmy Award-winning prime time specials adapted from Charles M. Schulz's comic strip Peanuts, brought Schulz's characters to Saturday mornings in The Charlie Brown and Snoopy Show for several years; later in the 1980s, the successful Garfield comic strip and TV specials were adapted into the long-running Garfield and Friends, also on CBS.

Other adaptations of familiar characters and properties included Lone Ranger, Star Wars (Star Wars: Droids and Ewoks) and Zorro (The New Adventures of Zorro).

During the mid-1980s through the early 1990s, series featuring younger and junior versions of characters from the 1970s and earlier were introduced, such as Muppet Babies, A Pup Named Scooby-Doo, and The Flintstone Kids.

Watchgroup backlash
Parents' lobbying groups such as Action for Children's Television began in the late 1960s. They voiced concerns about the presentation of commercialism, violence, anti-social attitudes and stereotypes in Saturday-morning cartoons. By the 1970s, these groups exercised enough influence, especially with the U.S. Congress and the Federal Communications Commission, that the television networks felt compelled to impose more stringent content rules for the animation houses. By 1978, the Federal Trade Commission was openly considering a ban on all advertising during television programming targeting preschoolers, and severe restrictions on other children's program advertising, both of which would have effectively killed off the format; the commission ultimately dropped the proposal.

The networks were encouraged to create educational spots that endeavored to use animation and/or live-action for enriching content, probably as a compromise between the advocacy groups on the one hand and the networks and producers on the other. The Schoolhouse Rock! series on ABC became a fondly-remembered television classic; ABC also had several other short-form animated featurettes, including Time for Timer and The Bod Squad, that had long runs. Just as notable were CBS's news segments for children, In the News, and NBC's Ask NBC News and One to Grow On, which featured skits of everyday problems with advice from the stars of NBC prime time programs.

Decline
The decline of the timeslot somewhat began in the early 1990s for a variety of reasons, most of which were tied to the broader multi-channel transition that affected numerous television genera. Among the direct and indirect factors in the decline of the Saturday morning cartoons:
 Creative declines and stagnation at the major television animation studios; by the late 1980s, major Saturday-morning producers such as Hanna-Barbera and Filmation had already recycled a limited number of common tropes and poorly developed stock characters numerous times over the previous two decades.
 The rise of first-run syndicated animated programs, which usually had a greater artistic freedom and looser standards than those that ran on a network, and ran on weekday afternoons, instead. These programs included G.I. Joe, The Transformers, Voltron, ThunderCats, He-Man and the Masters of the Universe, DuckTales, the first two seasons of Tiny Toon Adventures, and the first three seasons of Teenage Mutant Ninja Turtles.
 The FCC's introduction of the "E/I" mandate in 1990, later made more explicit in 1996. This required all broadcast networks to air "educational and informational" children's programs for at least three hours a week, which placed major creative limits on what could be aired on children's television (as the networks diverted its existing children's programming time to meet the E/I mandates). "Weird Al" Yankovic noted that he often received complaints from Broadcast Standards and Practices about content that children could imitate on the live-action/animated hybrid The Weird Al Show and that shoehorning the program to fit E/I mandates was a "deal with the devil" as it was the only way Yankovic could get the show broadcast (the show was canceled after 13 episodes mainly due to these creative restrictions).
 Concurrent with E/I, the Federal Trade Commission outlawed the advertising of both premium-rate telephone numbers and tie-in merchandise during children's hours. This cut off large revenue sources for children's programs on network television. The FCC's action in this field was in marked contrast to the agency's general orientation at the time toward deregulation, influenced by conservative political sentiment prevalent then.
 The rise of cable television networks such as the Disney Channel, Nickelodeon,  and Cartoon Network, which provided appealing animated entertainment throughout the week at nearly all hours, making Saturday-morning timeslots far less important to young viewers and advertisers. Cable channels had the additional advantage of being beyond the reach of FCC content regulations and did not have to abide by educational and advertising regulations; within a year of the E/I mandate being imposed, Nickelodeon shot ahead of all of the broadcast networks in Saturday-morning viewership ratings. Currently, there are at least 10 channels specializing in children's programming. Cable television was also better positioned to rerun children's programming as another source of revenue in an increasingly fragmented marketplace.
 The increased availability of home video services (both hard-copy formats and later through the Internet in the form of video on demand), which, just like cable, allowed children to watch their favorite cartoons at any given time.
 An increase in children's participation in Saturday activities outside the home, occasioned by more child-centered parenting practices (e.g., helicopter parenting) coming into vogue at the time. This meant that parents increasingly actively sought to reduce TV's influence on their charges, so that it would not be a "babysitter" for them, as some of the activist groups complained about previously.
 The gradual legalization of no-fault divorce in the United States over the course of the 1970s and 1980s, which prompted a spike in divorces, and a desire by parents to make more productive use of their time with their children. Visitation periods for the secondary custodial parent often occurred on Saturday mornings and afternoons, changing the routines of these children from a steady schedule every weekend, again, taking them away from television sets.
 The growth and rapid improvement in quality of home video game systems. Initially, video games were not directly harmful to Saturday morning cartoons, as the characters therein were easily franchised to animation; with the prominent exception of Pokémon in the 21st century, video game-related cartoons died out in the early 1990s and the playing audience matured to more adult-oriented games.
 Expansion of morning news shows onto the weekend lineup in the 1990s and early 21st century, such as Weekend Today, The Saturday Early Show and Good Morning America Weekend, along with the concurrent (albeit, more gradual) expansion of locally produced morning newscasts into the daypart. These shows targeted much older audiences, causing a major clash with the children's demographic and leading to loss of viewers overall. NBC switched to teen-oriented documentary programming in the time slot in 2016 because the programming was less likely to cause Weekend Today viewers to tune out.

The decline of Saturday-morning cartoons coincided with a rise in adult animation and a wave of new, creator-driven animation studios, which experienced a revival (much of it on prime time television) in the 1990s, as did animated feature films (see, for example, the Disney Renaissance), as the Saturday-morning cartoons fell out of favor. Fueled by the continued requirement for educational programming, networks continued to carry some cartoons well into the 2000s; by this point, these consisted either of re-purposed reruns from cable or outsourced blocks of cartoons imported from outside the U.S. As the popularity of these blocks continued to decline and no hit shows emerged from them, by the early 2010s networks began an outright phaseout of cartoons, with the major networks opting to fill their educational mandates by commissioning live-action, mostly documentary/human interest series that were relatively less labor-intensive and expensive to produce (and, more importantly for the networks, less restrictive in regard to commercials). Some of the space formerly filled by Saturday-morning cartoons would be occupied by infomercials (on local stations) and expanded coverage of college football on television, both of which greatly expanded as the result of separate government rulings in 1984.

The 1990s and onward
A 1996 Federal Communications Commission mandate, issued in the wake of the regulations on children's television programming in the United States, requires that stations program a minimum of three hours of children's regulations on children's television programming in the United States ("E/I") programming per week.

To help their affiliates comply with the regulations, broadcast networks began to reorganize their own efforts to adhere to the mandates, so their affiliates would not bear the burden of scheduling the shows themselves on their own time, thus eliminating the risk of having network product preempted by station efforts to follow the mandates. This almost always meant that the educational programming was placed during the Saturday-morning cartoon block.

NBC abandoned its original Saturday-morning cartoon lineup in 1992, replacing it with a Saturday-morning edition of Today and adding an all live-action teen-oriented block, TNBC, which featured Saved by the Bell, California Dreams and other teen sitcoms. Even though the educational content was minimal to non-existent, NBC labeled all the live-action shows with an E/I rating and provided the legal fiction of a blanket educational summary boilerplate text provided to stations to place in their quarterly educational effort reports to the FCC. Cartoons returned to the network in the fall of 2002, after cable network Discovery Kids (now Discovery Family) won the rights to the block in an auction, beating out other children's television companies (notably Nickelodeon, which recently programmed CBS's Saturday-morning block under the name Nickelodeon on CBS).

CBS followed NBC's lead in 1997 by producing CBS News Saturday Morning for the first two hours of its lineup and an all-live-action block of children's programming. The experiment lasted only a few months, and CBS brought back its animated series CBS Storybreak.

In the 1990s, Japanese television shows targeted towards children and teenagers were introduced to American television, including live-action tokusatsu superhero shows such as Power Rangers (Super Sentai) and VR Troopers (Metal Hero Series), and anime shows such as Pokémon, Dragon Ball, Sailor Moon, Digimon and Yu-Gi-Oh!. This led to a transition in the Saturday-morning slot from traditional American Saturday-morning cartoons towards Japanese anime, which have dominated the Saturday-morning genre since the 1990s. Yu-Gi-Oh! in particular was the most popular Saturday-morning cartoon during the 2000s.

In 2004, ABC was the last of the broadcast networks to add a Saturday-morning edition of its morning news program (in its case, Good Morning America Weekend) in the first hour of its lineup, mainly due to internal affiliate criticism of the lack of network coverage of the February 2003 Space Shuttle Columbia disaster, which occurred on a Saturday morning, forcing them to take coverage from other video news agencies (the networks were also feeling pressure from competition with cable news outlets that ran a "24/7" cycle). Prior to that, and particularly in the early 1990s, it was not uncommon for affiliates to preempt part or all of ABC's cartoon lineup with local programming.

Fox carried little or no E/I programming, leaving the responsibility of scheduling the E/I shows to the affiliates themselves (although the network did eventually add daily reruns of The Magic School Bus to meet the E/I mandates from 1998 to 2001). Following the closure of its 4Kids TV block in 2008, Fox would not carry any children's programming at all for five years until the launch of Xploration Station. The WB was far more accommodating to its stations; for several years, the network aired the history-themed Histeria! five days a week, leaving only a half-hour of E/I programs up to the local affiliates to program.

Several channels, while not offering original animated series, do air reruns of older Saturday-morning cartoons. Boomerang, a spin-off channel of Cartoon Network, specialized primarily in rerun of Saturday-morning cartoons from the 1960s and 1970s (the majority of which come from Hanna-Barbera, which, like Boomerang, is owned by Warner Bros. Discovery). In the 2010s, the channel's focus shifted toward airing reruns of canceled animated series from the 1990s and 2000s (many of which were never intended for the Saturday-morning programming block), and as of 2014, all earlier cartoons are relegated to "graveyard" (i.e., little-viewed) slots. Hub Network owned the broadcast rights to rerun several of Fox Kids' most popular programs (this was a byproduct of former Fox Kids head Margaret Loesch working as head of the Hub Network at the time); the majority of that programming was dropped or relegated to early morning time slots when Loesch left the network and the channel was relaunched as Discovery Family in 2014. A handful of digital subchannels also make use of Saturday-morning cartoon reruns, including Reach High Media Group (now known as Get After It Media)'s PBJ and Ion Media's Qubo.

In 2011, the major networks began to phase out weekend-morning educational programming aimed towards preteen audiences, in favor of live-action reality and docuseries outsourced to other producers. Litton Entertainment took over programming the Saturday-morning children's blocks from ABC, CBS, The CW, and NBC in 2011, 2013, 2014, and 2016, respectively. These programs are ostensibly aimed at teenagers and families, and networks have legally declared these new programs to be aimed at viewers between the ages of 13 and 16. This distinction is important from a legal perspective, as it removes the requirement for the programs to comply with the advertising limits imposed by the Children's Television Act.

By network

ABC

By the mid-1990s, broadcast networks were now becoming units of larger entertainment companies. ABC was bought by The Walt Disney Company in 1996, which began airing all Disney-produced programming by 1997 and canceled programs produced by companies other than Disney (with the notable exceptions of two shows, The Bugs Bunny and Tweety Show (Nickelodeon also aired the show until 1999), which continued to air until Warner Bros. discontinued the show in 2000) and Science Court (which was produced by Burns & Burns), which also ran until 2000. After being purchased by Disney, ABC's Saturday-morning cartoons became part of a block called ABC Kids before switching to a block of live-action and animated programs, also under the banner ABC Kids in 2002. Many of the block's shows were produced by Disney and also aired on the Disney Channel and/or Toon Disney. At one point, ABC Kids had only two animated shows on its schedule, while the remainder of the lineup consisted of live-action entertainment shows. By late 2008, most shows that were part of the ABC Kids block (except for Power Rangers outside of the MMPR re-version) were reruns of older episodes that originally aired a few years earlier; this remained the case for the next three years, with no episodes added into rotation (thus, for instance, the first season of Hannah Montana was still running on ABC Kids in constant repeats, even though several further seasons had aired on Disney Channel by the time the block ended).

The Disney Channel (which, like ABC, is owned by The Walt Disney Company) launched a Saturday-morning block of its popular animated programming, initially named "Disney Channel on ABC", in June 2011. On August 27, 2011, ABC ended the ABC Kids block. ABC was the first network to outsource its E/I liabilities and Saturday-morning program block to Litton; Litton's ABC block is known as the Litton's Weekend Adventure, which is currently known as Weekend Adventure and the block is now operated by Hearst Media Production Group. The Disney Channel quietly ended its Saturday-morning cartoon block in 2014, then brought it back in 2017 under the "Get Animated!" branding.

CBS

In 1999, CBS was purchased by Viacom, bringing it under the same ownership as popular children's network Nickelodeon. CBS, in turn, ran programming from Nickelodeon and Nick Jr. from 2000 to 2006, nearly a year after Viacom split into two separate companies (Nickelodeon went to a newly created company under the Viacom name and CBS became the flagship property of the CBS Corporation). The two parties ended the Nickelodeon/Nick Jr.-branded block, which was replaced by the DIC Entertainment (now WildBrain)-produced Secret Slumber Party in September 2006. The block was rebranded as KEWLopolis, featuring an increased amount of animated series, in September 2007. On September 19, 2009, KEWLopolis was re-branded as Cookie Jar TV, with its target audience shifted toward preschoolers.

Cookie Jar TV ended its run on September 21, 2013, at which point Litton also took over programming CBS' E/I liabilities and Saturday-morning programming. Litton's CBS block is known as the CBS Dream Team. This is the second time CBS has dropped animated children's programming from its lineup; the network had previously used an all-live-action programming lineup for the 1997–98 season when the E/I rules took effect, but reverted to animated programming the following season. The Dream Team block was also unusual among the other Litton blocks, as it included Litton's only scripted program (the block carried the federally subsidized police procedural The Inspectors from 2016 to 2019),  after the second merger between Viacom and CBS Corporation (later known as Paramount), the company's CEO during that time, Joseph Ianniello was receptive to the possibility of the return of Nickelodeon children's programming to CBS. As CBS is currently under contract with Litton Entertainment to carry the CBS Dream Team E/I programming block until the end of the 2022-23 television season, any Nickelodeon programming that CBS would decide to add would have to comply with the FCC's E/I requirements (as the network's affiliates use the block for most of their E/I compliance); as with cable TV, advertising restrictions would still be enforced for any programming targeted at children under 13.

Fox
From 1990 to 2002, Fox ran the Fox Kids block, which featured both animated and live-action series in the after-school hours on weekday afternoons from 3:00 p.m. to 5:00 p.m. (competing with syndicated afternoon children's programs on independent stations and affiliates of smaller networks). Among its notable series included animated series such as Taz-Mania, Batman: The Animated Series, X-Men: The Animated Series, Eek! The Cat, Bobby's World, Spider-Man: The Animated Series, and Animaniacs, live action shows like Power Rangers (the American adaptation of Super Sentai), Goosebumps, and Big Bad Beetleborgs (the American adaptations of Juukou B-Fighter and B-Fighter Kabuto), and Japanese anime series such as Digimon and Transformers: Robots in Disguise. Fox sold its children's division as part of its 2001 sale of Freeform to The Walt Disney Company; the network then leased its remaining Saturday-morning block to 4Kids Entertainment in 2002.

The 4Kids-produced block, which by that point had become 4Kids TV, ended its run on December 27, 2008. Fox opted to drop children's programming altogether rather than lease the block to another company, becoming the third broadcast network (after Ion Television, then known as Pax TV, which discontinued its Pax Kids lineup in 2000, before reviving children's programming as I: Independent Television through the 2006 launch of Qubo) and UPN) to completely abandon children's programming, and replaced 4Kids TV with a two-hour infomercial block called Weekend Marketplace; as with 4Kids TV and its predecessors, Fox has allowed several stations the option to decline to carry the block and lease it to another station in the market, especially those stations which had never carried Fox Kids following the 1994–1996 United States broadcast television realignment resulting from Fox's 1994 affiliation agreement with New World Pictures. Fox's owned-and-operated stations and affiliates hold the responsibility of carrying children's programming (generally through programs purchased off the syndication market) instead of the network.

On September 13, 2014, Fox's owned-and-operated stations (among some of their other affiliates, such as those owned by Tribune Media) picked up a new block entitled Xploration Station from Steve Rotfeld Productions. The three-hour block features E/I programs focused on science and space.

The CW

Origins

Kids' WB debuted on The WB on September 9, 1995, as a block on weekday mornings, weekday afternoons and Saturday mornings. During the run of the weekday morning blocks, the network aired the animated series Histeria! to meet content quotas for the network's affiliates. The Kids' WB weekday morning block ended in 2001, while the weekday afternoon block was discontinued on December 30, 2005, with The WB retaining the two afternoon hours to run a lineup of off-network syndicated reruns.

The CW begins airing children's programming

Kids' WB, now reduced to just the Saturday-morning block that was expanded to five hours from four with the removal of the weekday afternoon lineup, moved to The CW (which is part-owned by The WB's former parent Warner Bros. Discovery) on September 23, 2006 (CW owned-and-operated station WUPA in Atlanta debuted the block the following day, as it opted to carry the block on Sundays). The Kids' WB block ended its run on May 17, 2008, and was replaced on May 24, 2008, by the 4Kids Entertainment-produced Toonzai (4Kids already produced Fox's 4Kids TV block at that time, which would not end for another seven months due to a dispute with the network over distribution on Fox stations and compensation for the time lease). The CW4Kids was renamed Toonzai on August 14, 2010 (with the former brand being retained as a sub-brand to fulfill branding requirements imposed by 4Kids), Toonzai was replaced by Vortexx, produced under a time lease agreement with Saban Capital Group (which had acquired some of 4Kids' assets, including certain programs, in an auction earlier in the year) on August 25, 2012.

The Yu-Gi-Oh! Zexal episode, Memory Thief: Part 2 was the final first-run animated series episode to air on Vortexx on June 7, 2014, and was also the last time any of the first-run animated series episodes added into rotation on Saturday mornings, at which point Vortexx programming continued, but with redundant programming until Vortexx ended its run on September 27, 2014. The CW at which point turned over its E/I liability and Saturday-morning programming to Litton as well. Litton's CW block is known as One Magnificent Morning and since 2017 is at three hours in length.

NBC

NBC entered into a partnership with digital cable and satellite network Discovery Kids to provide original programming from the channel on NBC's Saturday-morning lineup in 2002; Discovery Kids ran on the network from September 14, 2002, to September 2, 2006. NBC replaced that block with Qubo, a three-hour "educational entertainment" block that debuted on September 9, 2006 (with accompanying blocks on co-owned Spanish network Telemundo on weekend mornings and on Ion Television once weekly), as part of a programming partnership between parent company NBCUniversal, Ion Media, Scholastic Corporation, Nelvana and DreamWorks Classics, that resulted in the creation of a companion digital multicast network on Ion Television's stations; the Qubo blocks on NBC and Telemundo ended on June 30, 2012, leaving only the Ion block and standalone Qubo Channel until their full closure on February 28, 2021.

On July 7, 2012, NBC launched a new Saturday-morning block aimed at preschool-aged children, NBC Kids, under a time-lease agreement with co-owned cable network Sprout (which NBC, through corporate parent Comcast, also owned a minority interest i- before purchasing it outright in 2013). NBC Kids, which was the only and final Saturday-morning programming block to air animated programming, ended its run on September 25, 2016.

On February 24, 2016, NBC announced a new E/I block produced by Litton Entertainment, The More You Know—a brand extension of NBC's public service announcement brand "The More You Know", and it launched on October 8, 2016, resulting in NBC removing all cartoons from its Saturday-morning lineups for the first time since September 1992.

This TV
On November 1, 2008, This TV launched airing a daily children's program block called Cookie Jar Toons, which was programmed by the Canada-based Cookie Jar Group (now WildBrain). The block featured mainly scripted animated and live-action series; Cookie Jar-produced programs that did not comply to regulations on children's television programming in the United States aired under the sub-block This is for Kids. Cookie Jar Toons/This is for Kids was discontinued on October 31, 2013, effectively removing Saturday children's programming from the network; after Tribune Broadcasting assumed part-ownership of This TV from Weigel Broadcasting the following day, Tribune replaced the block with a three-hour Sunday morning lineup of exclusively E/I-compliant programs from various syndication distributors.

On May 2, 2017, Sinclair Broadcast Group announced that it would introduce a new children's programming block named KidsClick, which airs on mainly CW and MyNetworkTV affiliates, and nationally on This TV, beginning on July 1, 2017. The block was transferred from This TV to TBD nationally starting on July 1, 2018, ahead of the collapse of the attempted acquisition of Tribune Media by Sinclair Broadcast Group. At the time of its closure, it aired no E/I programming.

KidsClick aired for the last time on March 31, 2019, after being on the air for just 20 months.

DIC Kids Network/Cookie Jar Kids Network
In 2003, DIC Entertainment launched a syndicated children's programming block titled the DIC Kids Network (branded as The Incredible World of DIC on-screen), which aired select animated series from the DIC Entertainment catalog (and later some third-party programming) on Fox, UPN and The WB (Later The CW and MyNetworkTV)-affiliated stations, alongside independent stations to allow these stations to meet required E/I programming quotas. The block was distributed by Tribune Entertainment and later by Ascent Capital Group.

With the purchase of DIC Entertainment by the Canada-based Cookie Jar Group (now WildBrain) in 2008, the block was later relaunched as the Cookie Jar Kids Network in 2009 and various additional programs from the Cookie Jar Group catalog were added to the lineup. The block ended on September 18, 2011.

PBS Kids
PBS has run daytime children's programming targeted at children between the ages of 4 and 12 since the network debuted on October 5, 1970, as did PBS's predecessor, National Educational Television, going back to roughly the mid-1960s. Its afternoon and Saturday morning children's programming was folded into a daily block called PTV (which aired weekdays from 2:00 p.m. to 5:00 p.m. and Saturdays from 9:00 a.m. to Noon local time). On September 6, 1999, the block was rebranded as "PBS Kids" and spun off into a 24-hour cable channel using the same name, which was turned into a joint venture with Comcast, HIT Entertainment, and Sesame Workshop in 2005, called PBS Kids Sprout, which later became simply Sprout due to Comcast buying full ownership of the network via NBCUniversal, eventually becoming Universal Kids in 2017. The PBS Kids cable channel was provided by DirecTV.

Then, PBS Kids was divided into two sub-blocks and they were PBS Kids Go! and the PBS Kids Preschool Block. An additional three-hour weekend morning block for preschool-aged children that was produced in conjunction with the Canada-based animation studio Nelvana called the PBS Kids Bookworm Bunch premiered on September 30, 2000, and ended in 2004. PBS Kids Go! debuted in 2004 and ended in 2013, alongside the preschool block that same year. The network continues to offer Saturday-morning programming as of 2015, though, as with most PBS programming, local member stations retain the right to refuse it outright for other programming such as instructional/DIY/cooking shows for adults, carrying it on Sundays instead, or placing it on a subchannel. Also, other PBS member stations maintain full-time or half-time subchannels with self-programmed and slotted PBS Kids content which may share channel space with other networks such as Create or a statewide political proceedings-coverage network.

Retro TV

Retro Television Network's Saturday-morning lineup consisted of classic cartoons from the 1960s through the 1990s, most of which were produced by Filmation, licensed via DreamWorks Classics. Due to corporate consolidation which led to the DreamWorks library being owned by NBCUniversal in 2016, this lineup was eventually pulled for low-cost barter E/I content and other newer cartoons unable to find distribution otherwise. As of 2019, Retro carries The Houndcats and The Barkleys, two DePatie–Freleng Enterprises cartoons from the 1970s, on its Saturday-morning lineup in addition to its E/I liabilities.

TeleXitos

TeleXitos airs both cartoons and three-hour children's programming; however, only two non-regulations on children's television programming in the United States programming airs in the early morning and afternoon hours such as He-Man and the Masters of the Universe and She-Ra: Princess of Power. Like Retro Television Network and MundoMax, it does not air commercials aimed at children. It is the only Spanish-language subchannel to air cartoons on Saturdays.

MeTV and MeTV Plus

On January 2, 2021, MeTV premiered Saturday Morning Cartoons, a four-hour block featuring Popeye (as well as other animated shorts from the Fleischer Studios and Famous Studios libraries), Pink Panther (as well as other shorts from the pre-1986 Metro-Goldwyn-Mayer library), Tom and Jerry, and Looney Tunes/Merrie Melodies shorts, each packaged in dedicated hour-long sub-blocks. blocks. (The block’s launch coincided with the debut of Toon In With Me, a one-hour weekday morning program that premiered two days later, with a format inspired by locally produced hosted “cartoon showcases” commonly aired through the early 1990s.) MeTV Plus, a companion network that launched on May 15, 2021, began airing an extension block titled Sunday Night Cartoons, which relies on the same library of animated content featured on the MeTV block.

At various points between 2012 and 2015, MeTV aired other older, acquired Saturday morning children's programs, including He-Man and the Masters of the Universe, She-Ra: Princess of Power, Gumby, Mr. Magoo, and Sid and Marty Krofft programs such as H.R. Pufnstuf and Land of the Lost.

See also

 Animation in the United States in the television era
 Lists of United States network television schedules
 List of weekday cartoons
 Saturday morning preview specials
 Animation
 Saturday Morning All Star Hits!

References

External links

 
 Saturday-morning grid of 1967, year of debut of Fantastic Four and Spider-Man
 TV Party presents the schedules and program profiles for every series the networks broadcast on Saturday Mornings from the mid-Sixties all through the Seventies.
 St. James Encyclopedia of Pop Culture: Saturday Morning Cartoons
 

Children's television in the United States
History of animation
 
Saturday mass media
Television terminology
1960s neologisms
Youth culture in the United States